The Heroine of Mons is a 1914 British silent war film directed by Wilfred Noy (the maternal uncle of Leslie Howard) and starring Dorothy Bellew, Leslie Howard and Bert Wynne. The film marked the screen debut of Howard, who went on to be leading star of British and Hollywood cinema. The film was made during the opening weeks of the First World War, and refers to the Battle of Mons.

Cast
 Dorothy Bellew as The Girl 
 Leslie Howard  
 Bert Wynne

References

Bibliography
 Cochrane, Claire. Twentieth-Century British Theatre: Industry, Art and Empire. Cambridge University Press, 2011.

External links
 

1914 films
1914 war films
British war films
British silent short films
1910s English-language films
Films directed by Wilfred Noy
British World War I films
British black-and-white films
Silent war films
1910s British films